Anders "Ankan" Mattias Roland Johansson (born 4 May 1974) is a Swedish comedian, television and radio presenter. He has presented Djursjukhuset, Fiska med Anders and Succéduon med Anders och Måns all broadcast in SVT. On Sveriges Radio he has presented Morgonpasset, Starkt material, Så funkar det and Wallraff.

Radio shows
1998 - 2000 - Wallraff
2001 - 2003 — Så funkar det

Filmography
2002 - 2003 — Anders & Måns (TV-series)
2006 – Fråga Anders & Måns (TV-series)
2008 – Skägget i brevlådan (TV-series)
2008 – Djursjukhuset (TV-series)
2010 – Anders och Måns (TV-series)
2012 – Fiska med Anders (TV-series)
2014 – Stjärnhoppningen (TV-series)
2014 – Fiska med Anders (TV-series)
2016 – Skolan (TV-series)
2017 – Parlamentet (TV-series)
2018 – På spåret (TV-series)
2018–2020 – Parlamentet (TV-series)
2019 – Släng dig i brunnen (TV-series)
2020 – Bäst i test (TV-series)
2020 – Se upp för Jönssonligan - Vanheden

References

External links 

Swedish comedians
Swedish radio personalities
Living people
1972 births